Numurkah is a closed railway station on the Goulburn Valley railway line in the town of Numurkah, Victoria, Australia.

History 
The station opened as the terminus of the railway from Shepparton on 1 September 1881 The line was extended north to Strathmerton and Cobram in October 1888, as well as a short distance west to Nathalia. The latter line was extended to Picola in 1896, as the Picola line, with the junction located to the north of the station, at the down end.

New station buildings were opened on 29 May 1969, and were refurbished in 1985. Passenger services beyond the station to Cobram were discontinued in 1981, as part of the New Deal timetable, but were resumed in 1983. The final closure was in 1993, when the Cobram service was cut back to Shepparton, as it is today. During August 1998, the interlocked frame and signal quadrants at Numurkah were abolished, along with all fixed signals, signal posts, main line points, a number of roads, including the road leading to the silos, and the turntable, leaving Numurkah unavailable for trains to cross. The main line was also realigned sightly at the down end of the yard.

Station 
Present facilities at the station include a disused platform, a station building, now leased to a local business, a footbridge over the tracks, and grain silos. The station once had a disused turntable however it has now been replaced by a small garden.

References

Disused railway stations in Victoria (Australia)
Railway stations in Australia opened in 1881
Railway stations closed in 1993